Nasir al-Din ( or  or , 'defender of the faith'), was originally a honorific title and is a masculine given name and surname of Arabic origin. There are many variant spellings in English due to transliteration including Nasruddin, and Nasiruddin. Notable people with the title or name include:

Politics and government
Nasir ad-Din Mahmud I of Great Seljuq, sultan of the Seljuk Empire 1092–1094
Al-Afdal Shahanshah (1066–1121), Fatimid vizier of Egypt, nicknamed Nasir al-Din
Nasir ad-Din Qabacha, Muslim Turkic governor of Multan from 1203
Nasir al-Din Mahmud (reigned 1201–22), of the Artuqids of Hisnkeyfa
Nasir ad-Din Mahmud, Zengid Emir of Mosul 1219–1234
Nasir ad-Din al-Malik al-Mansur Ibrahim bin Asad ad-Din Shirkuh (died 1246), emir of Homs under the Ayyubid dynasty
Al-Malik al-Said Nasir al-Din Barakah (1260–1280), Mamluk Sultan of Egypt and Syria
Nasr al-Din (died 1292), a provincial governor of Yunnan in China during the Yuan dynasty
Al-Nasir Nasir al-Din Muhammad ben Qalawun, or just Al-Nasir Muhammad (1285–1341), Mamluk sultan of Egypt
Nasir al-Din Muhammad (died ), Mihrabanid malik of Sistan
Nasir ud din Muhammad Shah III, a ruler of the Tughlaq dynasty 1390–1394
Nasir-ud-Din Mahmud Shah Tughluq, the last sultan of the Tughlaq dynasty to rule Delhi, 1394–1413
Nasir-ud-din Nusrat Shah Tughluq, a ruler of the Tughlaq dynasty
An-Nasir ad-Din Muhammad (1411–1422), the son of Sayf ad-Din Tatar, and a Mamluk sultan of Egypt 1421–1422
Nasir ad-Din al-Qasri Muhammad ibn Ahmad (died 1547), the young son of the Sultan of Fez, Sultan Ahmad
Nasir ud-din Muhammad, or Humayun (1508–1556), Mughal Emperor
Nasr ad-Din (died 1674), leader of the Berber tribes during the Char Bouba war
Nasir-ud-Din Haidar Shah (1803–1837), King of Oudh
Naser al-Din Shah Qajar (1831–1896), Shah of Persia
Amal Nasser el-Din (born 1928), Druze Israeli author and politician
A J M Nasir Uddin (born 1957), Bangladeshi politician
Nasser al-Din al-Shaer, or Nasser al-Shaer, (born 1961), Palestinian politician
Ghazi Nasr Al-Din (born 1962), Venezuelan diplomat and alleged Hezbollah supporter
Nasir Uddin Chowdhury (fl. from 1990s), Bangladeshi politician
Nasir Uddin (Naogaon politician) (died 2017), from Bangladesh
Nasir Uddin (Jessore politician) (fl. from 2018), from Bangladesh

Scholars and writers
Sayyed Nasir-ud-deen Abu Yusuf Bin Saamaan (1038–1067 CE), Sufi Saint
Sheykh Nasreddin Abul Hakayik Mahmud bin Ahmed al-Hoyi, or Ahi Evren (1169–1261), Turkish Muslim preacher
Nasir al-Din al-Tusi (1201–1274), Persian scientist, mathematician, philosopher, physician and theologian
Nasir al-Din Nasir Hunzai (born 1917), Pakistani writer and poet
Naseeruddin Naseer Gilani (1949–2009), a Pakistani poet and Islamic scholar of the Chishti Sufi order 
Nasreddin Lebatelier, pseudonym of Yahyah Michot (fl. from 1995), Belgian Muslim writer

Sports
Nasreddine Akli (born 1953), Algerian footballer
Nor Saiful Zaini Nasir-ud-Din (born 1966), Malaysian hockey player
Alain Nasreddine (born 1975), Canadian ice hockey player
Nasreddine Kraouche (born 1979), Algerian footballer
Ali Nasseredine (born 1983), Lebanese footballer
Nasserredine Fillali (born 1984), Algerian boxer
Nasr Eldin El Shigail (born 1985), a Sudanese footballer
Nasreddine Megdich (born 1991), Qatari handball player
Nur Nadihirah (born 1994), Malaysian cricketer

Other people
Naseeruddin Mauzi (died 1920), Indian Khilafat Movement activist
Nasreddin Murat-Khan (1904–1970), Russian-born Pakistani architect
Naseeruddin Shah (born 1949), Indian film actor and director
Mohamed Nasr Eldin Allam (born ), Egyptian water engineer and politician
Nasreddine Dinet (1861–1929), French orientalist painter
Naseeruddin Saami (fl. from 1950s), classical singer from Pakistan
Nasrdin Dchar (born 1978), Dutch-Moroccan actor
Nasir Uddin (anthropologist) (born ), Bengali anthropologist
Attia Nasreddin, Ethiopian businessman
Räshid Nasretdin (1920-2010), Finnish Tatar photographer, entrepreneur

Arabic masculine given names